Pablo's Tree is a children's story about a Latino boy who spends the day after every birthday with his grandfather, who decorates a tree for Pablo's birthday every year.  The book was written by Pat Mora and illustrated by Cecily Lang.

References

External links
 Pat Mora's website

American picture books
1994 children's books